Nedre Elvehavn is a neighborhood in the city of Trondheim in Trøndelag county, Norway.  It is situated the borough of Østbyen, just on the east side of the river Nidelva (across the river from Midtbyen, although it is generally considered to be part of the city center). Nedre Elvehavn is within walking distance of the Midtbyen and Trondheim Central Station. The area is located north of the neighborhood of Bakklandet, west of Møllenberg, and south of Nyhavna. In the late 1990s, the borough went through a major renovation, resulting in a new and expensive area close to the city centre with business, shopping, restaurants, pubs, and housing. Almost all buses running from the east into town stop at Nedre Elvehavn, as does the commuter train service Trønderbanen at Lademoen Station.

The area has developed on the site of Ørens Mekaniske Verksted and Trondheims Mekaniske Verksted, a mechanical workshop that was once the largest employer in Trondheim. The industrial site became disused in the late 1990s and turned into a new high-end area, though some of the original buildings and artifacts have been kept, including a dry dock and a crane. The area includes the shopping centre Solsiden, a hotel, marina, and the Trondheim offices of many companies, including DnB NOR, Vital, PricewaterhouseCoopers, Cap Gemini, Deloitte, Petrojarl, the British Consulate, the Mexican Consulate, the Polish Consulate, Google, NextGenTel, Radio 1, Scandinavian Airlines, and InCreo Interactive Creations AS. Across the street from Nedre Elvehavn is Trondheim Art Academy, part of the Norwegian University of Science and Technology.

References

External links

Web site on Nedre Elvehavn

Geography of Trondheim
Neighbourhoods of Trondheim
Redeveloped ports and waterfronts in Norway